"You You You" is a song recorded by Alvin Stardust in 1974, written and produced by Peter Shelley. The song spent 10 weeks on the UK Singles Chart, reaching number 6 in 1974. The single was released on Magnet Records, and included the song "Come On!" on the B-side, which was written by Alvin Stardust and produced Peter Shelley.

The song appears on numerous albums compilation albums, including Greatest Hits (1977), The Very Best of Alvin Stardust (1996), The Alvin Stardust Story (2007), and My Coo Ca Choo (2007).

Tracks
 "You You You" - 2:50 (written and produced by Peter Shelley)
 "Come On!" - 2:45 (written by Alvin Stardust and produced by Peter Shelley)

Charts

References

External links
 You You You at discogs.com

1974 singles
Alvin Stardust songs
Songs written by Peter Shelley
1974 songs
Magnet Records singles